Rượu nếp (sometimes also called rượu nếp bắc,  or rượu nếp cẩm) is a pudding or drink from northern Vietnam.

Preparation
It is made from glutinous rice that has been fermented with the aid of yeast and steamed in a banana leaf. It may be either deep purplish-red or yellow in color depending on the variety of rice used. Rượu nếp is mildly alcoholic (rượu is the word for "alcohol" in Vietnamese). Depending on its consistency, it may be considered either a pudding or a wine. Thicker versions are eaten with a spoon, while more liquid varieties may be drunk as a beverage. Rượu nếp than is a brown-colored rice wine.

Many Vietnamese people regard rượu nếp as a healthful food, and believe that it wards off or kills parasites.

Although they are most typical of northern Vietnam, rượu nếp and rượu nếp than are available in Ho Chi Minh City, at the market near the residential quarter where northern Vietnamese people live.

Varieties
In Vietnam's Central Highlands, a similar rice wine, rượu cần (literally "stem wine" or "tube wine"), is drunk in a communal manner, through long reed straws out of large earthenware jugs. Rượu cần may be made out of ordinary rice, glutinous rice, cassava, or corn, along with leaves and herbs. Yet another variety of minority rice wine is rượu nếp nương, made from a glutinous rice grown in mountainous cultivation areas of Vietnam's northwest.

A similar dish, from southern Vietnam, is called cơm rượu, and consists of balls made from white glutinous rice in a mildly alcoholic rice wine.

See also
Cuisine of Vietnam
Cơm rượu
Rượu cần
Rượu đế
Rượu thuốc
Sơn Tinh (liquor)
Rice wine
Vietnamese wine

References

External links
Article about rượu nếp
Article about rượu nếp
Rượu nếp than recipe
Rượu nếp trắng recipe
Rượu nếp recipe (Vietnamese)

Rice pudding
Rice drinks
Rice wine
Vietnamese cuisine
Fermented foods
Vietnamese words and phrases